Matthew Alfred Reoch (born 25 February 1983) is a Gibraltarian former footballer who last played for Gibraltar Second Division side FC Olympique 13 and the Gibraltar national team, where he played as a defender.

He is the son of a former Gibraltar Football Association president Desmond Reoch (1954–2018).

International career

Santos was first called up to the Gibraltar senior team in February 2014 for friendlies against Faroe Islands and Estonia on 1 and 5 March 2014. He made his international début with Gibraltar on 5 March 2014 in a 2–0 home loss to Estonia.

International statistics

.

References

External links
 
 
 

1983 births
Living people
Gibraltarian footballers
Gibraltar international footballers
F.C. Olympique 13 players
Manchester 62 F.C. players
Association football defenders
Gibraltar Premier Division players